Air Marshall Islands is an airline based in Majuro, Marshall Islands. It is the flag carrier of the Marshall Islands, operating inter-island services in the Central Pacific. Its main base is Marshall Islands International Airport, Majuro.

History 
The airline was established in 1980 as Airline of the Marshall Islands; the current title was adopted in 1989. The airline is wholly owned by the Government of the Marshall Islands.

In January 2009, all flights were suspended while the airline's only plane, a 34-seat Bombardier Dash 8, suffered wing damage after colliding with a FAA antenna tower while being towed. Replacement parts were ordered, but flights were further delayed when the replacement part that arrived in February was for the wrong wing.

Services 
The airline's main base is at Majuro; the company operates flights to Bikini Atoll, Enewetak Atoll, Kwajalein Atoll, Rongelap Atoll and Jeh and Woja on Ailinglaplap Atoll. The flight schedule has most flights operating on a weekly basis.

Air Marshall Islands has offices providing reservations and flight information services at Majuro, Ebeye and Kwajalein.

Fleet

Current fleet
The Air Marshall Islands fleet consists of the following turboprop aircraft:

Former fleet
The airline's fleet previously included the following aircraft (as of December 2015):

1 Douglas DC-8 (1991-1996. Operated by Hawaiian Airlines 1991–1992. Operated by Arrow Air 1992–1996.)
1 Saab 2000 (1995-1998)
1 BAe 748 (1982-1996)
Historically, according to the Official Airline Guide (OAG), Air Marshall Islands was operating a Douglas DC-8-62CF "Combi" jetliner as well as a Hawker Siddeley HS 748 turboprop aircraft supplied in 1982.  The DC-8 Combi was operated in a mixed passenger/freight configuration and provided service linking Honolulu (HNL) with Kwajalein (KWA) and Majuro (MAJ) in competition with Continental Micronesia which was operating flights on the same routes with Boeing 727-200 aircraft at the time. Air Marshall Islands also operated a Saab 2000 high speed turboprop during the 1990s.  In addition, GAF Nomad STOL capable turboprop aircraft were previously operated as well.

References

External links

 Official website

Airlines of the Marshall Islands
Airlines established in 1980
1980 establishments in the Marshall Islands